Robert Kenneth Shaye (born March 4, 1939) is an American businessman, film producer, actor, director, and writer. He is the founder of New Line Cinema, a film production studio that distributed films such as A Nightmare on Elm Street, Teenage Mutant Ninja Turtles, and The Lord of the Rings. In 2008, he left New Line after it merged with Warner Bros. Pictures.

Biography

Early life
Shaye was born to a Jewish family in Detroit, Michigan, the son of Dorothy and Max Mendle Shaye, a supermarket owner and artist. His mother was an immigrant from Russia. He is the brother of actress Lin Shaye.

Shaye graduated from Detroit's Mumford High School. He earned a bachelor's degree in business administration from the University of Michigan and a J.D. degree from Columbia Law School. He also graduated from the University of Stockholm as a Fulbright scholar. Shaye is a member of the New York State Bar Association, and he has served on the board of trustees for the Neurosciences Institute, the Legal Aid Society, the American Film Institute, and the Will Rogers Motion Picture Pioneers Foundation.

Founding of New Line Cinema and acquisition by Turner and Time Warner
In 1967, Shaye formed New Line Cinema. The company started with a package of feature films and shorts rented to colleges. From there, New Line expanded to re-releases such as Reefer Madness and first-run domestic distribution of foreign films such as Get Out Your Handkerchiefs. New Line famously released blockbuster films such as A Nightmare on Elm Street and Teenage Mutant Ninja Turtles.

On January 28, 1994, New Line Cinema was acquired by the Turner Broadcasting System for $500 million, with Shaye earning more than $100 million. Later, in 1996, Turner Broadcasting System became part of Time Warner (which is currently known as WarnerMedia), a merger between Time Inc. and Warner Communications.

In 1998, when New Zealand director Peter Jackson brought his 25-minute pitch reel for a big screen adaptation of J.R.R. Tolkien's fantasy classic The Lord of the Rings to New Line, hoping to turn the three volumes into two films, Shaye suggested Jackson make three films instead. He subsequently greenlit a simultaneous production for all three installments. The Lord of the Rings was nominated a total of thirty Academy Awards, winning 17, including 11 awards for The Return of the King. At the box office, all three films are among New Line's highest-grossing films, earning a combined total of nearly $3 billion worldwide.

Investing Career
Independently and through his family office Lemoko Management Company he is an active investor in companies like Brat TV.

Unique Features
In June 2008, Shaye and company co-chairman Michael Lynne departed New Line and formed an independent film company, Unique Features.  The company's recent projects include The Mortal Instruments: City of Bones (Sony/Constantin), the TV series Shadowhunters (Freeform Television), When the Bough Breaks (Screen Gems),  and Ambition, directed by Shaye.

Filmography
He was a producer in all films unless otherwise noted.

Film

 As an actor

 As director

 As writer

 As cinematographer

 Second unit director or assistant director

 Thanks

Television

 As an actor

 Production manager

See also
 New Line Cinema

References

External links

 
 Interview (along with Michael Lynne) on Charlie Rose

1939 births
Film directors from Michigan
Male actors from Michigan
American male film actors
Film producers from Michigan
Columbia Law School alumni
Living people
American film studio executives
American film production company founders
American people of Russian-Jewish descent
American independent film production company founders
Businesspeople from Detroit
Ross School of Business alumni
20th-century American Jews
Mumford High School alumni
21st-century American Jews
Turner Broadcasting System people
Warner Bros. people
Fulbright alumni